ICCT is a four-character abbreviation with multiple meanings, and different capitalisations:

 International Criminal Court (ICCt) was established in 2002 as a permanent tribunal to prosecute individuals for genocide, crimes against humanity, and war crimes
 International Centre for Counter-Terrorism the Hague, is an independent organisation for the creation, collation and dissemination of information and skills relating to the legal and human rights aspects of counter-terrorism.
 International Conference on Communication Technology (ICCT), an annual conference series of the Institute of Electrical and Electronics Engineers.
 International Council on Clean Transportation is an independent non-profit organisation that provides technical and scientific analysis to environmental regulators.
 International Committee of Clean Technologies a non-governmental organisation.
 International Catamaran Challenge Trophy (ICCT) is a match racing series for catamarans (under sail), held annually.
 ICCT- Information communication and computation technology. it's universal technology. under this, we have many emerging technologies.